Broadwood is a town about 25 km to the north of the north side of the Hokianga harbour, in Northland, New Zealand. Herekino is 21 km to the west, and Mangamuka Bridge is the same distance to the east.

The Broadwood area was first settled by Pakeha in the 1880s, and an access road was constructed through the area from Takahue to Motukaraka on the Hokianga harbour. An unmetalled road through the Te Karae Valley to Kohukohu was constructed in 1908.

Demographics
The SA1 area is part of the larger Kohukohu-Broadwood statistical area.

The SA1 statistical area had a population of 135 at the 2018 New Zealand census, an increase of 15 people (12.5%) since the 2013 census, and a decrease of 27 people (−16.7%) since the 2006 census. There were 48 households, comprising 75 males and 57 females, giving a sex ratio of 1.32 males per female. The median age was 45.5 years (compared with 37.4 years nationally), with 21 people (15.6%) aged under 15 years, 24 (17.8%) aged 15 to 29, 66 (48.9%) aged 30 to 64, and 27 (20.0%) aged 65 or older.

Ethnicities were 57.8% European/Pākehā, 57.8% Māori, 6.7% Pacific peoples, and 4.4% Asian. People may identify with more than one ethnicity.

Of those people who chose to answer the census's question about religious affiliation, 35.6% had no religion, 48.9% were Christian and 4.4% had Māori religious beliefs.

Of those at least 15 years old, 12 (10.5%) people had a bachelor's or higher degree, and 33 (28.9%) people had no formal qualifications. The median income was $19,300, compared with $31,800 nationally. 9 people (7.9%) earned over $70,000 compared to 17.2% nationally. The employment status of those at least 15 was that 39 (34.2%) people were employed full-time, 12 (10.5%) were part-time, and 9 (7.9%) were unemployed.

Kohukohu-Broadwood statistical area
Kohukohu-Broadwood statistical area covers the area north of the Hokianga Harbour between Kohukohu and Broadwood.

Kohukohu-Broadwood had a population of 726 at the 2018 New Zealand census, an increase of 102 people (16.3%) since the 2013 census, and a decrease of 21 people (−2.8%) since the 2006 census. There were 285 households, comprising 378 males and 345 females, giving a sex ratio of 1.1 males per female. The median age was 50.7 years (compared with 37.4 years nationally), with 135 people (18.6%) aged under 15 years, 84 (11.6%) aged 15 to 29, 336 (46.3%) aged 30 to 64, and 168 (23.1%) aged 65 or older.

Ethnicities were 62.0% European/Pākehā, 53.3% Māori, 7.9% Pacific peoples, 3.3% Asian, and 1.7% other ethnicities. People may identify with more than one ethnicity.

The percentage of people born overseas was 14.5, compared with 27.1% nationally.

Of those people who chose to answer the census's question about religious affiliation, 40.9% had no religion, 40.1% were Christian and 8.3% had other religions.

Of those at least 15 years old, 87 (14.7%) people had a bachelor's or higher degree, and 144 (24.4%) people had no formal qualifications. The median income was $18,700, compared with $31,800 nationally. 33 people (5.6%) earned over $70,000 compared to 17.2% nationally. The employment status of those at least 15 was that 180 (30.5%) people were employed full-time, 75 (12.7%) were part-time, and 51 (8.6%) were unemployed.

Education
Broadwood Area School is a coeducational composite (years 1-15) school with a roll of  students as of  It was founded in 1908, and became a District High School in 1952, and an Area School in 1973. A state aided school functioned at Broadwood from 1895–1904.

Notes

External links
Broadwood Area School website

Far North District
Populated places in the Northland Region